A nickname is a descriptive name given in place of or in addition to the actual name of a person. As in many sports, in snooker many players have nicknames.

List of nicknames
This is a list of common nicknames for notable professional snooker players.

References

Snooker
Nicknames
Snooker